Rufskin is an American men's athletic, underwear, swimwear, sportswear and denim manufacturer headquartered in San Diego, California. Founded in 2002, the company is owned and operated by designer Hubert Pouches and president Douglas Coats.

Company history

Rufskin was created after Douglas Coats and Hubert Pouches relocated from France to Southern California. They met in Paris in 1990 where they were both involved in the fashion business and later made the move to the United States out West to California in 1993. Originally hand-made and distributed from a residential garage in the South Park neighborhood of San Diego, California, Pouches cites that they started the company with the idea of creating a men’s denim line that was “both sexy and unapologetic” about its origins. The name “Rufskin” came from the Brazilian Jiu-Jitsu term “casca grossa” meaning “thick skin, tough, hardcore or raw.” The name also coexists with a play on words from the 70s youth denim brand “Toughskins.” They were inspired by the legends of the American West from cowboys, to bikers and soon after, the motivation of athletic heroes. By moonlighting in the evenings after their day jobs, Coats and Pouches put the finishing touches on 4 denim styles that eventually debuted as the look and feel of the brand with trade names like Cody, Hustler, Trick and Ranger, focusing on details like “butt cleavage,” laced crotches, distressed finishes, boot cuts and super low rises which in 2002 was an anomaly in the men’s fashion market. Beginning with denim jeans, the line soon expanded to swimwear, athletic wear, leather and accessories, highlighting pieces like men’s bodysuits and underwear using denim, mesh and sheer fabrics that the mainstream market had reserved only for women audiences.

While well-received in the United States, Rufskin has a successful global presence while continuing to design, manufacture and distribute exclusively from Southern California. Since most of the manufacturing is done in a close radius of their headquarters, it allows for season-less collections and almost weekly product launches. Rufskin celebrated its 20th anniversary in 2022.

Advertising and collaborations

The visual identity of the Rufskin brand has always been very much part of its DNA. Creators Hubert Pouches and Douglas Coats both being fans of print magazines, one of the earliest photographers they engaged to photograph their collection for an ad was New York City based photographer Rick Day. The campaign featured models in a boxing gym outside New York wearing their popular terry cloth sportswear and denim from that period. Rufskin went on to work with Rick Day for several ad campaigns photographed on location in Lake Como, Italy, South Africa, the Sierra Mountains in California and Brazil, the latter of which won a Gold Iris Reader’s Choice Award for Campaign of the Year in 2011.

Since the early years, Rufskin has had long time partnerships with advertising and editorial with International publications such as Attitude Magazine from the United Kingdom and DNA Magazine from Australia.

Rufskin clothing has been featured on the covers of V Magazine photographed by Mario Testino, Vogue Italia photographed by Steven Klein, and featured in W Magazine, GQ, OUT Magazine photographed by Matthias Vriens-McGrath, Attitude Magazine, VMAN, Gayletter Magazine, Crotch, Factory Fanzine by Baldovino Barani, L’Officiel Poland, Vogue Hommes Japan, Dorian, Coitus, Winq Magazine, L’officiel Homme Italia and more.

In 2022, the Southern California menswear label collaborated for the second time
 with the Tom of Finland Foundation by forging a collection of custom perforated matte rubber apparel featuring images and inspiration from Touko Laaksonen, also coinciding with Rufskin’s 20th Anniversary. Owner and Head Designer Hubert Pouches conceptualizes Tom of Finland’s imagery by re-introducing 3 pieces achieved using a custom sublimation technique from the most popular styles from their previous collaboration. The collection features a few signature styles like flared chaps and pants which are a typical representation of Tom of Finland characters, which can also be seen on their logo patch, a silhouette of a man in the shadows smoking a cigarette. “This shape speaks volumes to me,” says Pouches. “The silhouette is the spirit of this collection by striking this sexy, confident and hustler-like pose. It represents to me how strong and ‘bien dans sa peau,’ how proud a man shows off his sexiness.” The collection is sold directly at rufskin.com and select retail partners across the globe.

Timeline

2002 – Coats and Pouches launched rufskin.com using photos they had developed, printed and scanned into the website featuring male models wearing the brand’s first denim designs that moved and flashed throughout the site. While products were not available to purchase online, they acquired a large following base and product inquiries from the site alone.

2004 – Rufskin outfits the dancers for Britney Spears’ Onyx Tour, wardrobe appearances for Showtime Network's “Queer as Folk series,” and soon after the cast of Falcon Video’s Velvet Mafia.

2008 – Rufskin is asked to be featured on Logo Television reality show, “The Janice Dickinson Modeling Agency.” The two-day episodes presented 4 models that were selected from a large group of men at a casting on day one of the shooting. Day-two of filming resumed the actual photoshoot of the Rufskin ad campaign, depicting the models in Rufskin jeans and underwear, captured by photographer Justin Monroe in a downtown Los Angeles warehouse.

2008 cont. – Rufskin moves its first headquarters location to the neighborhood of North Park, San Diego and launches its official retail site offering its products worldwide.

2010 – Rufskin opens a 3-month pop-up boutique in Chelsea, New York underneath the Gem Hotel.

2012 – Rufskin opens a permanent flagship store located at 235 West 19th Street between Seventh and Eighth Avenues in Chelsea, New York. “This new store, however, is no humble Chelsea jeans and underwear shop. The folks at Rufskin have created a sleek, white-walled SoCal-style boutique on an eclectic block,” published The Shophound. The store gained popularity with its glass walled dressing rooms, with the option for curtains to be drawn for the modest shopper. 

2012 cont. – Rufskin is commissioned to design and manufacture accessories for Madonna’s MDNA Worldwide Tour. Based on their Hero, Mauritz and Samurai styles, all were customized for the backup dancers on Madonna’s ninth concert tour.

2012 cont. – Rufhouse Magazine officially launches its premier issue. Rufhouse is an e-magazine that acts as a platform to showcase the lifestyle attached to the brand, photographed by Pouches and other guest photographers, with art direction by Coats.

2012 cont. – Coats and Pouches photograph Logan Alan Swiecki-Taylor in Palm Springs, California for Rufhouse Magazine, styled like the Farrah Fawcett red swimsuit poster. Swiecki-Taylor continues to be the face and muse of Rufskin today.

2012 cont. – Rufskin dresses Lady Gaga’s backup dancers in her “Applause” music video, showcasing their “Vasa” bodysuit and “Thane” leather/foam harness.

2013 – Rufskin opens their first European store in Amsterdam, Netherlands in the Flower District on Reguliersdwarsstraat 54. Sticking with its laid-back themed interior, Rufskin brought the California vibe to Amsterdam.

2014 – Rufskin opens its fourth store in Miami, Florida. The boutique expanded its operations beyond headquarters in San Diego, New York and Amsterdam, bringing their designs and customer care to South Florida. Rufskin Miami was located in the former Kardashian family-owned Dash store on 815 Washington Avenue in South Beach, Miami.

2015 – Rufskin designer Hubert Pouches forges a collection of athletic apparel featuring images and inspiration from the works of the iconic artist Touko Laaksonen, better known as Tom of Finland. Pouches had a primary goal when conceiving the capsule: “to pay homage to the legendary artist while simultaneously introducing him to a new generation of potential devotees,” said Pouches. The artwork of Tom of Finland was a significant inspiration in the genesis of the Rufskin label, specifically his characterization of masculinity. “Now that his influence has been channeled to create a co-branded collection, the desire was to produce something that distinctly represents both brands without simply generating a literal interpretation. The result is a modern line of athletic apparel that is at once imaginative, alluring, unpredictable and reverent,” says Coats.

2016 – Rufskin photographs their denim, sportswear, swimwear and underwear capsules at the famed Palais Bulles, on the outskirts of Cannes in the South of France.Owned by esteemed designer and fashion icon Pierre Cardin, the sprawling amorphous architectural marvel provided a once-in-a-lifetime backdrop to shoot their latest collection. Founders and photographic minds behind Rufskin, Hubert Pouches and Douglas Coast, jumped at the opportunity to spend time at the famous home as well as photograph exclusive pieces from Pierre Cardin’s latest collection. With muse and model Logan Swiecki-Taylor in tow, the team descended upon the home and wasted no time getting to work. See the fashion essay here at rufskin.com

2017 - Rufskin celebrates its 15 year anniversary.

2018 – Rufskin announces the launch of their 2018 swim/beachwear line introducing 4 groups of limited edition sublimation prints and classic solids, a tribute to the California lifestyle. Rufskin’s stretch denim swimwear marked a keystone in the brand’s history. The line featured custom printed denim swimwear with deep indigo hues and classic saddle details. Following the legalization of recreational cannabis use, the brand was proud to embrace it in a polished and sophisticated way with a series of original prints from botanical drawings to a glorified golden hemp leaf. Rufskin studio visits Central America in search of a background for the 2018 swimwear campaign. Charmed by immense tropical beauty and the “pura vida” vibe of the locals, they photograph in Montezuma, Costa Rica. The entire creative concept down to photography and styling were done in house by Coats and Pouches, featuring model and muse Logan Swiecki-Taylor.

2020 – Rufskin launches “Uomo Intimo” loungewear and “Softskin” capsules made from interlock twist yarn and stretch rayon. The line was created in lieu of the Covid-19 lockdown to provide comfortable clothing options for staying at home.

Legacy

Today, all Rufskin Studio campaigns and images are photographed by Pouches, with art direction by Coats, shot at the Rufhouse Studio in Rancho Mirage, California and surrounding Southern California locations primarily in the desert. Rufskin continues photographing the brand “in-house,” says Pouches. “The visual part of our work has always been very much part of the brand. Since we are based in California we are very fortunate to have the most amazing locations at our fingertips. We would have to say that California is at the epicenter of our work with the intent of transporting people to the beautiful landscapes of the Golden State: a symbol of freedom, nature, health and the great outdoors. Its culture fits our philosophy.”

Since 2002 Rufskin has become more of a lifestyle for its wearers, rather than just another pair of jeans. The Southern California-based brand, which also includes underwear, swimwear, sportswear, leisurewear and accessories, was created to enhance the individuality of the male form while at the same time redefining what sexy can look like. Essentially directed toward men, the concept of the brand focuses on the California Lifestyle. It is entirely designed and manufactured in Southern California.

All products are available at www.rufskin.com, their San Diego, California storefront and at select retailers around the world. New capsule collections are launched regularly, capturing the essence of the current moods.

References

Clothing brands
Sportswear brands